is a Japanese ice hockey player. He competed in the men's tournament at the 1998 Winter Olympics.

References

External links

1971 births
Living people
Japanese ice hockey players
Oji Eagles players
Olympic ice hockey players of Japan
Ice hockey players at the 1998 Winter Olympics
Sportspeople from Hokkaido
Asian Games gold medalists for Japan
Medalists at the 2003 Asian Winter Games
Ice hockey players at the 2003 Asian Winter Games
Asian Games medalists in ice hockey